Nancy Collins may refer to:

 Nancy Collins (?–1812), aka Nancy Clarke, Barbadian hotelier
 Nancy A. Collins (born 1959), United States horror fiction writer
 Nancy Walbridge Collins (born 1973), professor at Columbia University
 Nancy Adams Collins (born 1947), politician in Mississippi